Ooredoo Kuwait, formerly known as Wataniya Telecom, is a telecommunications company in Kuwait owned by the Ooredoo group. Its operations began in December 1999 when it launched wireless services as the second operator. It provides mobile, broadband internet and corporate managed services.

it is the strongest performer in the local market,  during the latest announcements,  the Revenue, EBITIDA growth and dividends per share scores the highest in comparison to the local Kuwaiti Telecom Market .

References

Kuwait
Telecommunications companies of Kuwait
Telecommunications companies established in 1999
Mobile phone companies of Kuwait
Companies based in Kuwait City
Kuwaiti companies established in 1999